Sericomyia militaria , (Walker, 1849), the  Narrow-banded Pond Fly , is a common species of syrphid fly observed across northern North America. Syrphid flies are also known as Hover Flies or Flower Flies because the adults are frequently found hovering around flowers from which they feed on nectar and pollen. The larvae of this genus are known as rat tailed maggots for the long posterior breathing tube.

References

Diptera of North America
Eristalinae
Insects described in 1849
Taxa named by Francis Walker (entomologist)
Hoverflies of North America